Obolo may refer to:
The obolus, a Greek silver coin worth a sixth of a drachma
Obolo language
Peter's Pence
Obolo, Akwa Ibom, a town in Nigeria
Andoni people, also called Obolo

People with the surname
Iván Obolo, Argentinian former football player
Pascale Obolo (born 1960), Cameroonian film director and artist

Language and nationality disambiguation pages